Buellia lichexanthonica is a species of saxicolous (rock-dwelling) lichen in the family Caliciaceae. Found in Brazil, it was formally described as a new species in 2017 by lichenologists André Aptroot and Marcela Eugenia da Silva Cáceres. The lichen has a thin (0.1–0.2 mm), dull yellow thallus covered with xanthone crystals. Its ascomata are round and black, about 0.2–0.5 mm in diameter with a flat disc. The ascospores are dark brown with an ellipsoid shape, one septum, and measure 11–13 by 6–7.5 μm. The specific epithet lichexanthonica refers to the presence of 4,5-dichlorolichexanthone, a lichexanthone derivative that is found in the cortex of the thallus.

See also
List of Buellia species

References

lichexanthonica
Lichen species
Lichens described in 2017
Lichens of Northeast Brazil
Taxa named by André Aptroot
Taxa named by Marcela Cáceres